The following list is a discography of production by Swizz Beatz, an American record producer and recording artist from The Bronx, New York. It includes a list of songs produced, co-produced and remixed by year, artist, album and title. With a career spanning over three decades, Swizz Beatz has contributed production on over 160 albums, including studio projects, compilations, soundtracks and mixtapes. Beatz has also produced 81 singles, a number of them certified gold or higher by the Recording Industry Association of America (RIAA).

Singles produced

1998

The LOX – Money, Power & Respect
16. "All for the Love"

DMX – It's Dark and Hell Is Hot
02. "Ruff Ryders' Anthem"

Busta Rhymes – E.L.E. (Extinction Level Event): The Final World Front
05. "Tear da Roof Off" 
07. "Just Give It to Me Raw"

N.O.R.E. – N.O.R.E
02. "Banned from T.V." (featuring Cam'ron, Jadakiss, Styles P, Big Pun & Nature)

Cam'ron – Confessions of Fire
02. "Glory" (featuring Noreaga)
18. "Shanghai"

Jay-Z – Vol. 2... Hard Knock Life
03. "If I Should Die" (featuring Da Ranjahz)
06. "Money, Cash, Hoes" (featuring DMX)
08. "Coming of Age (Da Sequel)" (featuring Memphis Bleek)

Flipmode Squad – The Imperial
04. "Run for Cover"

DJ Clue – The Professional
02. "Ruff Ryders' Anthem (Remix)" (performed by DMX, Drag-On, Eve, Jadakiss & Styles P)

DMX – Flesh of My Flesh, Blood of My Blood
01. "My Niggas" (skit)
04. "Ain't No Way"
06. "Keep Your Shit the Hardest" 
08. "It's All Good" 
09. "The Omen" (featuring Marilyn Manson)
11. "No Love for Me" (featuring Drag-On & Swizz Beatz)
13. "Blackout" (featuring The L.O.X. & Jay-Z)
14. "Flesh of My Flesh, Blood of My Blood"
15. "Heat" 
16. "Prayer II"/"Ready to Meet Him"

1999

Eve – Let There Be Eve...Ruff Ryders' First Lady 
01. "First Lady" (Intro)  
02. "Let's Talk About" (featuring Drag-On)
03. "Gotta Man"
04. "Philly Cheese Steak" (skit)  
05. "Philly, Philly" (featuring Beanie Sigel)
06. "Stuck Up" (featuring C.J.)
07. "Ain’t Got No Dough" (featuring Missy Elliott)
08. "BM" (skit)   
09. "Love is Blind"(featuring Faith Evans)
10. "Scenario 2000" (featuring DMX, The LOX & Drag-On)
11. "Dog Match" (featuring DMX) 
12. "My Bitches" (skit)  
14. "Maniac" (featuring Swizz Beatz)
15. "My Enemies" (skit)

N.O.R.E. – Melvin Flynt – Da Hustler
06. "Wethuggedout" (featuring Missy Elliott & Swizz Beatz)

Foxy Brown – Chyna Doll
05. "Dog and a Fox" (featuring DMX)

Ruff Ryders – Ryde or Die Vol. 1
02. "Down Bottom" (Drag-On featuring Juvenile)
03. "What Ya Want" (Eve featuring Nokio of Dru Hill)
04. "Jigga My Nigga (Jay-Z solo)
08. "Bugout" (DMX solo)
09. "Kiss of Death" (Jadakiss solo)
10. "The Hood" (featuring Beanie Sigel, Infra-Red, Nuchild, Mysonne, Drag-On)
11. "Platinum Plus" (Cross featuring Mase & Jermaine Dupri)
13. "Do That Shit" (Eve solo)
14. "Pina Colada" (Sheek Louch featuring Big Pun)
15. "Some X Shit" (DMX solo)
Leftover
00. "The Franklins" (Benzino featuring Busta Rhymes)
00. "J.O.S.E." (Jose solo)
00. You Know Why (LL Cool J solo)
00. "Girls Like That" (Mýa solo)
00. "Show Y'all" (Swizz Beatz solo)

Memphis Bleek – Coming of Age
03. "Memphis Bleek Is..."

Blackstreet – Girlfriend/Boyfriend Vinyl Maxi Single
00 "Girlfriend/Boyfriend (The Anthem Remix)" (featuring Sauce Money and 8th Avenue)

Various artists – The Corrupter Soundtrack
01. "More Money, More Cash, More Hoes" (Jay-Z featuring Memphis Bleek & Beanie Sigel)

Various artists – Violator: The Album
19. "Violators" (performed by L Boogie, Sonya Blade, Noreaga, Mysonne, Prodigy & Busta Rhymes)

Jay-Z – Vol. 3… Life and Times of S. Carter
05. "Things That U Do" (featuring Mariah Carey)
15. "Jigga My Nigga" (Bonus Track)
15. "Girl's Best Friend" (Bonus Track)

DMX – ...And Then There Was X
02. "One More Road to Cross"
07. "Party Up (Up in Here)"
12. "Don't You Ever"
15. "Comin' for Ya"

2000

Various artists – Any Given Sunday Soundtrack
13. "Move Right Now" (performed by Swizz Beatz, Drag-On & Eve)

The LOX – We Are the Streets
02. "Fuck You"
03. "Can I Live" 
06. "Felony Niggas" (Styles P solo)
07. "Wild Out" 
08. "Blood Pressure" (Jadakiss solo)
11. "Y'all Fucked up Now" 
13. "U Told Me" (featuring Eve)
16. "Bring It On" (Sheek Louch solo)
17. "If You Know" (featuring Drag-On, Eve & Swizz Beatz)
18. "We Are the Streets"

Various artists – Backstage: A Hard Knock Life
06. "Who Did You Expect" (performed by The LOX)

Mýa – Fear of Flying
01. "Turn it Up (Intro)" 
06. "The Best of Me" (featuring Jadakiss)
19. "Girls Like That" (Bonus Track)

Limp Bizkit – Chocolate Starfish and the Hot Dog Flavored Water
14. "Rollin' (Urban Assault Vehicle)" (featuring DMX, Method Man & Redman)

Drag-On – Opposite of H2O
02. "Opposite of H2O" (featuring Jadakiss)
06. "Niggas Die 4 Me" (featuring DMX)  
10. "Get It Right" (featuring DMX)  
13. "Drag Shit" (featuring Styles P)
16. "The Way Life Is"
17. "Pop It"
18. "What's It All About"
19. "Life Goes On"

Busta Rhymes – Anarchy
04. "We Put It Down for Y'all" 
09. "All Night"

Funkmaster Flex – The Mix Tape, Vol. 4: 60 Minutes of Funk
03. "I Don't Care" (performed by Jadakiss)

Eightball & MJG – Space Age 4 Eva
09. "Boom Boom" (featuring Swizz Beatz)
14. "Thank God"

Ruff Ryders – Ryde or Die Vol. 2
01. "WW III" (performed by Scarface, Snoop Dogg, Yung Wun & Jadakiss) 
02. "2 Tears In a Bucket" (performed by Sheek Louch, Redman & Method Man )
06. "Holiday" (performed by Jadakiss & Styles P)
09. "Fright Night" (performed by Swizz Beatz & Busta Rhymes)
11. "Twisted Heat" (performed by Twista and Drag-On)

Strings – The Black Widow

02. "Um" (featuring Swizz Beatz)
07. "Raise It Up" (featuring Drag-On)
08. "Blunt Object"
09. "Table Dance" 
12. "Treason"

2001

Various artists – Oz Soundtrack
14. "Tonight" (performed by Drag-On)

Eve – Scorpion
02. "Cowboy"
07. "Got What You Need" (featuring Swizz Beatz & Drag-On)
09. "Gangsta Bitches" (featuring Trina & Da Brat)
12. "Thug in the Street" (featuring Drag-On & The LOX)

Various artists – Violator: The Album, V2.0
04. "Put Your Hands Up" (performed by LL Cool J)

Various artists – Rush Hour 2 Soundtrack
09. “Crazy Girl" (performed by LL Cool J & Mashonda)

Tha Eastsidaz – Duces 'n Trayz: The Old Fashioned Way
20. "Everywhere I Go" (featuring Kokane)

Jadakiss – Kiss tha Game Goodbye
02. "Jada's Got a Gun"
12. "On My Way"
14. "Kiss Is Spittin'" (featuring Nate Dogg and Mashonda)
15. "Fuckin’ or What?"

Damian Marley – Halfway Tree
15. "Half Way Tree"

Angie Stone – Mahogany Soul
06. "Wish I Didn't Miss You" (co-produced with Andrea Martin & Ivan Matias)

Mary J. Blige – No More Drama
09. "Where I've Been" (featuring Eve)

DMX – The Great Depression
15. "You Could Be Blind" (featuring Mashonda)
17. "A Minute for Your Son"

Jermaine Dupri – Instructions
13. "Whatever" (featuring Nate Dogg, R.O.C. & Tigah)
15. "Yours and Mine" (featuring Jagged Edge)

Ludacris – Word of Mouf
04. "Cry Babies (Oh No)"

Nas - Stillmatic
11. "Braveheart Party" (featuring Mary J. Blige & Bravehearts)

Ruff Ryders – Ryde or Die Vol. 3: In the "R" We Trust
01. "Intro"
09. "Some South Shit" (performed by Ludacris, Icepick Jay, Fiend & Yung Wun)
17. "Ruff Ryders All-Star Freestyle" (Bonus Track) (performed by J-Hood, Shizlansky, Keem, Lock, Rockstar & Cassidy)

2002

Swizz Beatz – G.H.E.T.T.O. Stories
02. "Ghetto Stories"
03. "Big Business" (performed by Jadakiss & Ron Isley)
05. "Endalay"(featuring Busta Rhymes)
06. "S.H.Y.N.E." (performed by Shyne & Mashonda)
07. "Ghetto Love" (performed by Mashonda & LL Cool J)
09. "Good Times" (performed by Styles P)
10. "Gone Delirious" (performed by Lil' Kim)
11. "N.O.R.E." (performed by N.O.R.E.)
12. "Let Me See Ya Do Your Thing" (performed by Birdman & Yung Wun)
13. "Island Spice" (performed by Eve)
14. "Guilty" (featuring Bounty Killer)
15. "Salute Me (Remix)" (performed by Nas, Fat Joe & Cassidy)
16. "We Did it Again" (performed by Metallica & Ja Rule) (co-produced with Bob Rock & Metallica)
17. "Bigger Business" (performed by Ron Isley, Diddy, Birdman, Jadakiss, Snoop Dogg, Cassidy & TQ)

Birdman – Birdman
19. "Ghetto Life" (featuring TQ, Lil Wayne & Cam'ron)

N.O.R.E. – God's Favorite
05. "Nahmeanuheard" 
12. "Wanna Be Like Him" (featuring Mashonda)
17. "Nahmeanuheard (Remix)" (featuring Fat Joe, Cassidy, Cam'Ron & Capone)

The Reepz – All Things Come to an End.....

05. "I Think Not"
14. "Ya Dead Now"

Eve – Eve-Olution
05. "Party in the Rain" (featuring Mashonda)  
13. "Double R What" (featuring Jadakiss & Styles P)

Styles P – A Gangster and a Gentleman
02. "Good Times" 
07. "Lick Shots" (featuring Jadakiss, Sheek Louch & J-Hood)
08. "And I Came To…" (featuring Eve & Sheek Louch)

Busta Rhymes – It Ain't Safe No More
15. "Together" (featuring Rah Digga)

Nas – God's Son
17. "The G.O.D." (bonus track)

2003

Various artists – Biker Boyz: Music from the Motion Picture
03. "We Did It Again" (Metallica and Ja Rule)
05. "Ride Out" (Swizz Beatz featuring Cassidy)

R. Kelly – Snake (Remix) (12")
00. "Snake (Remix)" (featuring Cam'ron and Big Tigger)

Bravehearts – Bravehearted
04. "Twilight" (featuring Nas)

Lil' Kim – La Bella Mafia
07. "This Is Who I Am" (featuring Swizz Beatz & Mashonda)

Jay-Z – The Blueprint 2.1
14. "Stop" (Bonus Track)

Bow Wow – Unleashed
01. "Get It Poppin'"

DMX – Grand Champ
05. "Get It on the Floor" (featuring Swizz Beatz)
20. "A'Yo Kato" (featuring Magic & Val)

Ruben Studdard – Soulful
04. "Take the Shot"
11. "Don't Quit on Me"

2004

404 Soldierz – All Out War
15. "Walk Like A Soldier"

DJ Kay Slay – The Streetsweeper, Vol. 2 - The Pain from the Game
09. "The Truth" (Performed by LL Cool J)

Drag-On – Hell and Back
03. "Bang Bang Boom" (featuring Swizz Beatz)

Ivy Queen – Real
03. "Soldados"

Jadakiss – Kiss of Death
10. "Real Hip-Hop" (featuring Sheek Louch)

Jin – The Rest Is History
03. "Get Your Handz Off" (featuring Swizz Beatz) (co-Produced with Neo Da Matrix)
19. "Check the Clock" (Bonus Track)

Yung Wun – The Dirtiest Thirstiest
04. "Yung Wun Anthem" (co-produced with Eric McCain)
12. "Represent"

Shyne – Godfather Buried Alive
05. "Shyne" (featuring Mashonda)

Pitch Black – Pitch Black Law
02. "Shake That"  
13. "N.Y.C."

Cassidy – Split Personality
02. "Hotel" (featuring R. Kelly)
03. "Lipstick" (featuring Jazze Pha)
04. "Get No Better" (featuring Mashonda)
05. "Make You Scream" (featuring Snoop Dogg)
07. "Tha Problem"
08. "Pop That Cannon" (featuring Styles P)
13. "Husslin'"
16. "Hotel (Vacation Remix)" (featuring R. Kelly & Trina)

T.I. – Urban Legend
13. "Bring 'Em Out"

2005

Memphis Bleek – 534
04. "Like That"

Destiny's Child – Number 1's
05. "Check on It" (Beyoncé featuring Slim Thug & Bun B)

Young Gunz – Brothers from Another
02. "Set It Off" 
08. "Beef"

Ivy Queen – The Best of Ivy Queen
10. "Angel Caído"

Cassidy – I'm a Hustla
02. "I'm a Hustla" 
05. "B-Boy Stance" (featuring Swizz Beatz)
09. "C-Bonics" 
10. "Bellybutton"
15. "I'm a Hustla (Remix)" (featuring Mary J. Blige)

Mashonda – January Joy
01. "Step Into My World" (Intro)
03. "Blackout" (featuring Snoop Dogg)
05. "Back of da Club" 
15. "Thank You" (Outro)
16. "Blackout" (featuring Nas) (Bonus Track)

Ruff Ryders – The Redemption Vol. 4
05. "What They Want" (performed by Swizz Beatz, Infa.Red & Cross)
13. "Aim 4 The Head" (performed by Jin, J-Hood & Cassidy)

Mariah Carey – The Emancipation of Mimi
16. "Secret Love" (Japan Bonus Track)

Fat Joe – All or Nothing
07. "Listen Baby" (featuring Mashonda)

Cuban Link – Chain Reaction
04. "Comin' Home Wit Me" (featuring Avant)
13. "Shakedown"
14. "Talk About It" (featuring Jadakiss)

Smitty
"Diamonds on My Neck"
"Diamonds on My Neck (Remix)" (featuring Lil Wayne & Twista)

India.Arie – I Am Not My Hair EP
02. "I Am Not My Hair (Swizz Beatz Remix)" (featuring Swizz Beatz)

Don Omar – Da Hitman Presents Reggaetón Latino
05. "Dale Don Dale (Remix)" (featuring Fabolous)

The Notorious B.I.G. – Duets: The Final Chapter
03. "Spit Your Game" (featuring Twista & Krayzie Bone)
"Spit Your Game (Remix)" (featuring Twista, Krayzie Bone, Eightball & MJG)

2006

Papoose – A Threat and a Promise
05. "Across The Track" (featuring Nas)

Remy Martin – There's Something About Remy: Based on a True Story
05. "Whuteva"

Zeebra – The New Beginning
08. "Let's Get It Started"

T.I. – King
09. "Get It"

Various artists – Take the Lead (soundtrack)
02. "Take the Lead (Wanna Ride)" (Bone Thugs-n-Harmony and Wisin & Yandel featuring Fatman Scoop, Melissa Jiménez, & Drag-On)

Ice Cube – Laugh Now, Cry Later
09. "Stop Snitchin'"

Busta Rhymes – The Big Bang
02. "Touch It" 
Leftover
00. "Touch It (Remix)" (featuring Mary J. Blige, Rah Digga, Missy Elliott, Lloyd Banks, Papoose & DMX)
00. "Bounce Step"

Tha Dogg Pound – Cali Iz Active
03. "Sittin' on 23z"

DMX – Year of the Dog... Again
02. "We in Here (featuring Swizz Beatz)
03. "I Run Shit" (featuring Big Stan)
04. "Come Thru (Move)" (featuring Busta Rhymes & Swizz Beatz)
06. "Baby Motha" (featuring Janyce)

Beyoncé – B'Day
02. "Get Me Bodied" 
04. "Upgrade U" (featuring Jay-Z) 
05. "Ring the Alarm"
12. "Lost Yo Mind" (Pre-order Bonus Track)

JoJo – The High Road
02. "The Way You Do Me"

The Game – Doctor's Advocate
09. "Scream on 'Em" 
Leftover
00. "State Your Name" (featuring Cassidy & Lil Flip)

2Pac – Pac's Life
01. "Untouchable (Swizz Beatz Remix)" (featuring Krayzie Bone)

Jay-Z – Kingdom Come
12. "Dig a Hole" (featuring Sterling Simms)

Gwen Stefani – The Sweet Escape
05. "Now That You Got It"

Fantasia Barrino – Fantasia
11. "Surround U"

DJ Clue – The Professional 3
16. "Ugly (Thug It Out)" (performed by Jadakiss & Swizz Beatz)

2007

Snoop Dogg – Unreleased Heatrocks
12. "Got My Own" (featuring Swizz Beatz)

Eve – Here I Am (shelved)
00. "Tambourine" 
00. "Give It To You" (featuring Sean Paul)
00. "Cash Flow" (featuring T.I.)
00. "Get That Money"
00. "Turn Me On" (featuring Sizzla)

Bone Thugs-n-Harmony – Strength & Loyalty
11. "Candy Paint" (featuring Swizz Beatz & Autumn Rowe)
Leftovers
00. "Come with Me" 
00. "Give Me The Love" 
00. "When The Thugs Come Out"
00. "What's Up" (featuring Swizz Beatz)
00. "Real Niggas"
00. "We Workin"

R. Kelly – Double Up
01. "The Champ" (featuring Swizz Beatz) (co-produced with The Runners & R. Kelly)

UGK – UGK (Underground Kingz)
16. "Hit the Block" (featuring T.I.) (Bonus Track)

Swizz Beatz – One Man Band Man
02. "It's Me Bitches" 
07. "Take a Picture" 
08. "Top Down" (co-produced with The "E. McCaine" Edition)
10. "Part of the Plan" 
12. "It's Me...(Remix)" (featuring Lil Wayne, R. Kelly & Jadakiss)

N.O.R.E. – Noreality
01. "Set It Off" (featuring Swizz Beatz & J-Ru$$)

Chris Brown – Exclusive
13. "I'll Call Ya"

Cassidy – B.A.R.S. The Barry Adrian Reese Story
02. "My Drink n My 2 Step" (featuring Swizz Beatz) (co-Produced with The Individualz)
06. "Innocent Man (Misunderstood)" (co-Produced by The Individualz)
08. "Leanin' on the Lord" (featuring Angie Stone)
12. "Take a Trip" (featuring Mashonda)

Alicia Keys – As I Am
15. "Waiting For Your Love" (iTunes Bonus Track) 
Leftover
00. "Teenage Love Affair (Remix)" (featuring LL Cool J)

Styles P – Super Gangster (Extraordinary Gentleman)
02. "Blow Ya Mind" (featuring Swizz Beatz)

Bow Wow & Omarion
"Girlfriend (Remix)" (featuring Cassidy & Soulja Boy Tell 'Em) (co-Produced with The Individualz)

2008

Various artists – Grand Theft Auto IV soundtrack
00. "Blow Ya Mind (Remix)" (Styles P featuring Swizz Beatz, Jadakiss & Sheek Louch)

Layzie Bone – Thugz Nation
04. "Toast 2 That" (featuring Wish Bone, Krayzie Bone & Swizz Beatz)

Fat Joe – The Elephant in the Room
06. "Drop" (featuring Jackie Rubio & Swizz Beatz)

Mariah Carey – E=MC²
11. "O.O.C."

Ivy Queen – Ivy Queen 2008 World Tour LIVE!
09. "Soldados"

Estelle – Shine
12. "Shine"

Elephant Man – Let's Get Physical
06. "Jump" 
12. "Who Wanna" (featuring Swizz Beatz)
13. "Five-O (Remix)" (featuring Swizz Beatz, Wyclef Jean, Assassin, Yung Joc & Diddy)

Lil Wayne – Tha Carter III
06. "Dr. Carter"

Jay-Z & Mary J. Blige – Heart of the City Tour
00. "You're All Welcome" (co-produced with The Individualz)

G-Unit – T.O.S: Terminate on Sight
13. "Get Down"

Daz Dillinger – Only on the Left Side
02. "I'm from the Hood" (featuring Swizz Beatz)

Ice Cube – Raw Footage
19. "Don't Make Me Hurt Ya Feelings" (Best Buy pre-order)

Bow Wow – Half Man, Half Dog Vol. 1
02. "Big Bank" (featuring Swizz Beatz) (co-Produced with The Individualz)
10. "Shake It" (featuring Swizz Beatz)

T.I. – Paper Trail
10. "Swing Ya Rag" (featuring Swizz Beatz)

Ludacris – Theater of the Mind
09. "Nasty Girl" (featuring Plies)

Maroon 5 – Call and Response: The Remix Album
01. "If I Never See Your Face Again (Swizz Beatz Remix)"

Rock City – Wake the Neighbors
00. "I'm Leavin'" (featuring Akon & Swizz Beatz) (co-produced with Alex da Kid)

2009

Goodz – Bronx Zoo II
02. "Breathe on 'Em"

Jamie Jones – Celebrity Music
02. "Whatever"
03. "Ayo"

Bow Wow – New Jack City II
11. "Shake It" (featuring Swizz Beatz)
13. "Big Girls" (featuring Yung Joc) (Wal-Mart Deluxe Edition Bonus Track) (co-produced by Raj for The EntouRAJ)

Jadakiss – The Last Kiss
03. "Who's Real" (featuring OJ da Juiceman & Swizz Beatz)

Maino – If Tomorrow Comes
01. "Million Bucks" (featuring Swizz Beatz)

Whitney Houston – I Look to You
01. "Million Dollar Bill" (co-produced with Alicia Keys)

Jay-Z – The Blueprint 3
07. "On to the Next One" (featuring Swizz Beatz)

Fat Joe – Jealous Ones Still Envy 2 (J.O.S.E. 2)
11. "Blackout" (featuring Swizz Beatz & Rob Cash of KAR)

Tha Dogg Pound – That Was Then, This Is Now
02. "Attitude Problem" (featuring Swizz Beatz & Cassidy)

Chris Brown – Graffiti
01. "I Can Transform Ya" (featuring Swizz Beatz & Lil Wayne)

Alicia Keys – The Element of Freedom
05. "Wait Til You See My Smile" (co-produced with Jeff Bhasker)
10. "Put It in a Love Song" (featuring Beyoncé)
17. "Almost There" (Empire Edition)

Busta Rhymes – Back on My B.S.
Leftover
00. "Watch Ya Mouth" (featuring Swizz Beatz)

Young Money – We Are Young Money
Leftover
00. "First Place Winner" (Lil Wayne, Boo, Currensy & Mack Maine featuring Swizz Beatz)

2010

Various artists – Hope for Haiti Now
17. "Stranded (Haiti Mon Amour)" (Jay-Z featuring Bono, The Edge & Rihanna)

T.I. – Fuck a Mixtape
03. "Spazz Out"

Stack Bundles – Salute Me
04. "It's on Now"

Mr. Money – Who Don't Like Money Vol. 2
12. "And I Like"
15. "Bubba Kushy"

Ludacris – Battle of the Sexes
13. "Tell Me a Secret" (featuring Ne-Yo)

Drake – Thank Me Later
07. "Fancy" (featuring T.I. & Swizz Beatz) (co-produced with 40)

Trey Songz – Passion, Pain & Pleasure
19. "I Like Dat" (featuring Swizz Beatz & T.I.) (Bonus Track)

Gucci Mane – The Appeal: Georgia's Most Wanted
06. "Gucci Time" (featuring Swizz Beatz)
10. "It's Alive" (featuring Swizz Beatz)
Leftover
00. "Showtime"

Busta Rhymes
"Stop the Party (Iron Man)" (featuring Swizz Beatz)
"Stop the Party (Remix)" (featuring Swizz Beatz, T.I., Cam'ron, Ghostface Killah & DMX)

Cassidy – Face 2 Face EP
04. "Henni & Bacardi"

Nicki Minaj – Pink Friday
02. "Roman's Revenge" (featuring Eminem)
10. "Here I Am"
17. "Wave Ya Hand" (Bonus Track)
18. "Catch Me" (Bonus Track)

Lloyd Banks – H.F.M. 2 (The Hunger for More)
15. "Stuntin'" (Bonus Track)

Diddy-Dirty Money – Last Train to Paris
02. "Ass on the Floor" (featuring Swizz Beatz)

Kanye West – GOOD Friday Series
00. "Power (Remix)" (featuring Jay-Z & Swizz Beatz) (co-Produced by S1 & Kanye West)
00. "Don't Look Down" (featuring Lupe Fiasco, Mos Def, & Big Sean)

Lil Jon – Crunk Rock
Leftover
00. "I Do" (featuring Swizz Beatz & Snoop Dogg)
00. "I Do (Remix)" (featuring Swizz Beatz, Pitbull & Omega)

2011

Swizz Beatz – Monster Mondays Vol. 1

01. "DJ Play that Beat" (featuring Estelle)
02. "Bang Bang" (featuring Pusha T & Pharrell)
03. "King Tut" (featuring Rakim) (co-produced with The Individualz)
04. "Y'all Don't Really Know" (performed by DMX & Busta Rhymes)
05. "Bad One" (featuring Busta Rhymes)
06. "Ass on the Floor" (Diddy-Dirty Money featuring Swizz Beatz)
07. "Hot Steppa #1" (featuring Eve)
08. "We Keep It Rockin’" (featuring Maino, Jadakiss, Jim Jones & Joell Ortiz)
10. "Speechless" (Alicia Keys featuring Eve)
11. "The Transporter" (performed by Rick Ross)
12. "Freaky I Iz" (Kevin McCall featuring Diesel & Chris Brown)
15. "Time to Get Paid" (performed by DMX)
16. "Love" (performed by Colin Smith)
17. "Top Down Nas Edition" (performed by Nas) (co-produced with The "E. McCaine" Edition) (From the Swizz Throwback Vault)
18. "Co-Pilot" (featuring Snoop Dogg & JR Reid)
19. "Freaky" (performed by Jadakiss, Akon, Murda Mook & Shella)
20. "Ready Ready" (Sean Cross featuring Swizz Beatz)
23. "We Workin'" (performed by Bone Thugs-n-Harmony) (From the Swizz Throwback Vault)
24. "Earthquake" (Swizz Beatz & DJ Semtex present Dot Rotten)
25. "Catch Me" (Nicki Minaj featuring Swizz Beatz)
27. "My Hood" (performed by Jim Jones, Juelz Santana & Cassidy) (From the Swizz Throwback Vault)
28. "Dear Anne" (performed by Lil Wayne)

Swizz Beatz
00. "Bonkers"
00. "International Party" (featuring Alicia Keys)

Maino – Keep It Rockin EP
01. "Keep It Rockin" (featuring Swiz Beatz, Jadakiss, Jim Jones & Joell Ortiz)

Verbal – Visionair
04. "Ball n Bounce"

D12 – Return of the Dozen Vol. 2
Leftover
00. "Ugly Bitch" (featuring Swizz Beatz)

Jennifer Hudson – I Remember Me
04. "Angel" (co-produced with Alicia Keys)
07. "Everybody Needs Love" (co-produced with Alicia Keys)

Bushido – Jenseits von Gut und Böse
07. "Mo'Fucka" (featuring Swizz Beatz)

Jay-Z & Kanye West – Watch the Throne
08. "Welcome to the Jungle"
10. "Murder to Excellence" (co-produced with S1)

The Game – The R.E.D. Album
Leftovers
00. "We On" (featuring Ryan Leslie)
00. "Higher" (featuring Nas & Jay Electronica)

Glasses Malone - Beach Cruiser
16. "Stronger" (iTunes Store Bonus Track)

Lil Wayne – Tha Carter IV
Leftover
00. "Dear Anne"

Mateo – Love & Stadiums II
01. "Say It's So" (featuring Alicia Keys)

2012

Josh Xantus – Everybody Hates Josh X
12. "Movie Star"

Erick Sermon – Breath of Fresh Air
21. "Set It Off" (featuring Mone, Fred da Godson and Swizz Beatz)

Nas – Life Is Good
08. "Summer on Smash" (featuring Miguel & Swizz Beatz)

DMX – Undisputed
02. "What They Don't Know"
14. "Ya'll Don't Really Know"

Alicia Keys – Girl on Fire
05. "New Day"

French Montana – Mac & Cheese 3
14. "Diamonds" (featuring J. Cole & Rick Ross)

The Rangers
00. "Tip"

The LOX
"Grand Wizard" (featuring Swizz Beatz)

2013

Lil Wayne – I Am Not a Human Being II
Leftover
00. "Ghoulish"

Funkmaster Flex – Who You Mad At? Me or Yourself? 
15. "Get It In" (Ne-Yo featuring Swizz Beatz)

Eve – Lip Lock
07. "Mama in the Kitchen" (featuring Snoop Dogg)

Jay-Z – Magna Carta... Holy Grail 
 10. "Versus" (produced with Timbaland)
 17. "Open Letter" (Bonus Track) (produced with Timbaland)

Pusha T – My Name Is My Name
03. "Sweet Serenade" (featuring Chris Brown)(additional production by Kanye West)
Leftover
 "In This Ho (Lambo)" (featuring Swizz Beatz)

2014

DJ Kay Slay – The Last Hip Hop Disciple
02. "Real Hip Hop" (featuring Papoose, Vado and Ransom)

Reek da Villian
00. "Go Off" (featuring Kendrick Lamar, Ace Hood and Swizz Beatz)

French Montana
00. "Megadeath" (featuring Swizz Beatz, Remy Ma & Jadakiss)

2015

DMX – Redemption of the Beast
10. "56 Bars"

Raekwon – Fly International Luxurious Art
09. "Soundboy Kill It"

French Montana – Casino Life 2
04. "I Ain't Gonna Lie" (featuring Lil Wayne)

Empire Cast – The Complete Season 2
02. "Born to Lose" (Jussie Smollett, Yazz and Sean Cross)
32. "Ready to Go" (Jussie Smollett)

Jadakiss – Top 5, Dead or Alive 
03. "You Don't Eat" 
06. "Jason" (featuring Swizz Beatz)

2016

Kendrick Lamar – Untitled Unmastered
07. "untitled 07 – 2014 - 2016"

Kanye West – The Life of Pablo
01. "Ultralight Beam" (featuring Chance the Rapper and Kirk Franklin)

Schoolboy Q – Blank Face LP
02. "Lord Have Mercy"

Snoop Dogg – Coolaid
06. "Let Me See Em Up"
13. "Light It Up"
14. "Side Piece"
18. "Let The Beat Drop (Celebrate)"

Alicia Keys – Here 
02. "The Gospel" (co-produced with Alicia Keys and Mark Batson)
03. "Pawn It All" (co-produced with Keys and Batson)
06. "She Don't Really Care / 1 Luv" (co-produced with Keys and Batson)
08. "Illusion Of Bliss" (co-produced with Keys and Batson)

2017

DMX
00. "Bain Iz Back"

Busta Rhymes
00. "AAAHHHH!!!"

Romeo Santos – Golden
04. "Premio"

Fabolous & Jadakiss – Friday on Elm Street
03. "Theme Music" (featuring Swizz Beatz)

Tate Kobang – Tate Ko
03. "Ello?" (featuring Swizz Beatz)

2018

Jussie Smollett – Sum of My Music
02. "Catch Your Eye" (featuring Swizz Beatz)
06. "Staycation"
10. "I Know My Name"

N.O.R.E. – 5E
10. "Parade" (featuring Kent Jones and Yung Reallie)

Lil Wayne – Tha Carter V
04. "Uproar"

T.I. – Dime Trap
05. "The Weekend" (featuring Young Thug)

Swizz Beatz – Poison
01. "Poison Intro" (featuring Áine Zion)
02. "Pistol On My Side (P.O.M.S.)" (featuring Lil Wayne)
03. "Come Again" (featuring Giggs)
07. ”Cold Blooded" (featuring Pusha-T)
10. "Swizz Montana" (featuring French Montana)

Leftovers
 "Everyday (Coolin')" (featuring Eve)
 "V.I.P. Chillin'" (featuring Dr. Dre & Sean Cross)
 "The Visuals"
 "Rock'n'Roll" (featuring Lenny Kravitz, Lil Wayne and Travis Barker)
 "Skyscrapers" (featuring Bono and Kanye West)
 "It's You" (featuring Mary J. Blige)
 "Show Off" (featuring Alexandra Burke; produced by Swizz Beatz)
 "Dance Like a White Girl"
 "International Party" (featuring Alicia Keys)
 "You Stay on My Mind"
 "Hands Up" (featuring Lil Wayne, Rick Ross, Nicki Minaj & 2 Chainz)

2019

Nas – The Lost Tapes II
01. "No Bad Energy”	 
08. "Adult Film"

The Game – Born 2 Rap
 10. “Gucci Flip Flops”

Snoop Dogg – I Wanna Thank Me
 05. "Countdown" 
 14. "Rise to the Top"

Dave East – Survival
 01. "They Wanna Kill You"

2020

Jay Electronica - A Written Testimony
 03. "The Blinding" (co-produced with AraabMuzik & Hit-Boy)

4-IZE - Look Into My Ize
 11. "Pedestal" (featuring Shawnna and Alexander Blane)

Joey Bada$$ - The Light Pack
 02. "No Explanation" (co-produced with Sean C & LV) (featuring Pusha T)

The Lox - Living Off Xperience
 01. "Gave It to Em" (co-produced with AraabMuzik)

Busta Rhymes - Extinction Level Event 2: The Wrath of God
 02. "The Purge" (co-produced with Avenue)

2021

Various artists - Godfather of Harlem
 00. "No Bark When I Bite" (performed by Rick Ross and Cruel Youth)

Pop Smoke - Faith
 18. "8-Ball" (featuring Kid Cudi)

Papoose – June
 01. "Combative Soldiers"
 04. "Production Murder"

Kanye West – Donda
 17. "Jesus Lord" (featuring Jay Electronica and Larry Hoover Jr.)
 27. "Jesus Lord, Pt. 2" (featuring Jay Electronica, The Lox, and Larry Hoover Jr.)

2022

Mary J. Blige – Good Morning Gorgeous
14. "Runnin'" (featuring Ne-Yo)

Game – Drillmatic – Heart vs. Mind
22. "Money Cash Clothes" (featuring ASAP Rocky)

Westside Gunn – Hitler Wears Hermes 10
08. "Science Class" (featuring Stove God Cooks, Busta Rhymes, Raekwon, and Ghostface Killah)

Busta Rhymes – The Fuse Is Lit EP
03. "Break This Bitch Up"

2023

Tia Lee – TBA
00. "Goodbye Princess"

Lil Wayne – TBA
03. "Kant Nobody" (featuring DMX)

References

External links
 
 
 
 

Production discographies
 
 
Hip hop discographies
Discographies of American artists